Stenoplesictidae is the name of a polyphyletic family of extinct civet-like feliforms.

Taxonomy

Classification

Phylogenetic tree
The cladogram shown below represents the current phylogenetic relationships of members of family Stenoplesictidae (green):

References
 Morlo M. & Nagel D. (2007). "The carnivore guild of the Taatsiin Gol area: Hyaenodontidae (Creodonta), Carnivora, and Didymoconida from the Oligocene of Central Mongolia". Annalen des Naturhistorischen Museums Wien 108A: 217–231.
 Morlo M., Miller E. R. & El-Barkooky A. N. (2007). "Creodonta and Carnivora from Wadi Moghra, Egypt". Journal of Vertebrate Paleontology 27(1): 145–159.
 de Bonis, L., S. Peigne, & M. Hugueney (1999) – "Carnivores feloides de l'Oligocene superieur de Coderet-Bransat (Allier, France)". Bulletin de la Société Géologique de France 1999 170: 939–949.
 Morales, J., Pickford, M., Salesa, M. & Soria, D., 2000. The systematic status of Kelba, Savage, 1965, Kenyalutra, Schmidt-Kittler, 1987 and Ndamathaia, Jacobs et al., 1987, "(Viverridae, Mammalia) and a review of Early Miocene mongoose-like carnivores of Africa". Annales de Paléontologie: Vol. 86, #4, pp. 243–251.
 Hunt, R. M., Jr (1998) – "Evolution of the aeluroid Carnivora. Diversity of the earliest aeluroids from Eurasia (Quercy, Hsanda-Gol) and the origin of felids". American Museum Novitates; no. 3252 (PDF)

Oligocene feliforms
Prehistoric mammal families
Eocene first appearances
Miocene extinctions
Feliforms